Petr Kubíček (born April 30, 1957) is a Czechoslovak sprint canoer and marathon canoeist who competed in the early 1980s. He won a bronze medal in the C-2 10000 m event at the 1981 ICF Canoe Sprint World Championships in Nottingham.

Kubíček also competed at the 1980 Summer Olympics in Moscow, finishing fifth in both the C-2 500 m and C-2 1000 m events.

References

Sports-reference.com profile

1957 births
Canoeists at the 1980 Summer Olympics
Czechoslovak male canoeists
Living people
Olympic canoeists of Czechoslovakia
ICF Canoe Sprint World Championships medalists in Canadian